Roman Rosul is a retired American soccer player who played professionally in the North American Soccer League and American Soccer League.

Youth
The son of Ukrainian immigrant parents, Rosul played for the Cleveland Lviv youth teams growing up.  In 1971, he graduated from Rocky River High School.  He scored 32 goals in 11 games his senior season as the team went undefeated and won the Ohio State High School soccer championship.  He then attended Cleveland State University where he played on the men's soccer team from 1972 to 1975.  He was a 1975 Honorable Mention (third team) All American and was inducted into the Vikings' Hall of Fame in 1988.  In addition to his collegiate career, Rosul also played for the amateur Inter-Italia SC of Cleveland which lost to Maccabi Los Angeles in the 1973 National Challenge Cup.  In that game, Rosul both scored and was ejected with a straight red.

Professional
In 1976, the Miami Toros drafted him in the first round of the North American Soccer League draft.  In 1977, he began the season with the Fort Lauderdale Strikers before moving to the Connecticut Bicentennials.  At the end of the season, the Bicentennials moved to California to become the Oakland Stompers.  Rosul signed with the Stompers, but was traded to the Memphis Rogues where he played from 1978 to 1980.  In April 1983, he joined the Jacksonville Tea Men of the American Soccer League.

References

External links
 NASL stats

1953 births
Living people
Soccer players from Cleveland
American people of Ukrainian descent
American soccer players
American Soccer League (1933–1983) players
Connecticut Bicentennials players
Cleveland State Vikings men's soccer players
Fort Lauderdale Strikers (1977–1983) players
Jacksonville Tea Men players
Memphis Rogues players
Miami Toros players
North American Soccer League (1968–1984) players
North American Soccer League (1968–1984) indoor players
Association football forwards
Rocky River High School (Ohio) alumni